Ty Smith may refer to:

 Ty Smith (ice hockey) (born 2000), Canadian ice hockey player
 Ty Smith (drummer) (born 1977), American drummer
 Tye Smith (born 1993), American football cornerback